Indian Telly Award for Best Actor in a Supporting Role is an award given by Indiantelevision.com as part of its annual Indian Telly Awards for TV serials, to recognize a male actor who has delivered an outstanding performance in a Supporting Role.

The award was first awarded in 2004. Since 2010, the award has been separated in two categories, Jury Award and Popular Award. Jury award is given by the chosen jury of critics assigned to the function while Popular Award is given on the basis of public voting.

As of 2014, the original award is renamed to  the Indian Telly Award for Best Actor in a Supporting Role (Drama) and an additional award for Best Actor in a Supporting Role (Comedy) has been introduced.

Superlatives

Popular

2000s
2001 Not Awarded
2002 Not Awarded
2003 Not Awarded
2004 akshit Jayesh sharma ]]kyunki saas bhi kabhi bahu thi 2000 series as karan Virani
' - ' 
Harsh Chhaya - Astitva...Ek Prem Kahani as Dr Manas
Arun Bali - Des Mein Niklla Hoga Chand as Bauji
Parmeet Sethi - Jassi Jaissi Koi Nahin as Raj
Deepak Qazir - Kahaani Ghar Ghar Kii as Babuji
Mohnish Behl - Sanjivani - A Medical Boon as Dr. Shashank2005 Hiten Tejwani - Kyunki Saas Bhi Kabhi Bahu Thi as Karan Virani Aditya Srivastava - C.I.D. as Abhijit
Vinay Jain - Remix as Sumeet
Virendra Saxena - Jassi Jaissi Koi Nahin as Balwant Walia
Chaitanya Choudhury - Kahiin To Hoga as Akshat
Alok Nath - Woh Rehne Waali Mehlon Ki as Yashvardhan Mittal2006 Hiten Tejwani - Kyunki Saas Bhi Kabhi Bahu Thi as Karan Virani  
Aditya Srivastava - C.I.D. as Abhijit
Shabbir Ahluwalia - Kahiin To Hoga as Rishi
Mohammad Iqbal Khan - Kavyanjali as Shouriya
Deven Bhojani - Baa Bahoo Aur Baby as Gopal "Gattu" Thakkar2007 Hiten Tejwani - Kyunki Saas Bhi Kabhi Bahu Thi as Karan Virani  
Akshay Anand - Saat Phere...Saloni Ka Safar as Brijesh Pratap Singh
Jamnadas Majethia - Baa Bahoo Aur Baby  as Dr. Harshad Thakkar 
Ali Asgar - Kahaani Ghar Ghar Kii as Kamal Agarwal
Yatin Karyekar - Ghar Ki Lakshmi Betiyaan as Suryakant 
Arjun Bijlani - Left Right Left as Cadet Aalekh Sharma2008 Jay Bhanushali - Kayamath as Neev 
Yatin Karyekar - Ghar Ki Lakshmi Betiyaan as Suryakant 
Anoop Soni - Balika Vadhu as Bhairav
Alok Nath - Sapna Babul Ka...Bidaai as Prakashchand  
Vikram Gokhale - Jeevan Saathi as Vikram Rathod2009 Anoop Soni - Balika Vadhu as BhairavAlok Nath - Sapna Babul Ka...Bidaai as Prakashchand 
Ayub Khan - Uttaran  as Jogi Thakur
Aditya Lakhia - Agle Janam Mohe Bitiya Hi Kijo as Nanku
Vikrant Massey - Balika Vadhu as Shyam

 2010s2010 Ayub Khan - Uttaran as Jogi Thakur 
Anoop Soni - Balika Vadhu  as Bhairav
Vikram Gokhale - Mera Naam Karegi Roshan as Thakur Veer Pratap Singh
Vinay Rohrra - Laagi Tujhse Lagan as Bajirao
Amit Pachori - Jhansi Ki Rani as Tatya Tope 2011 - No Event Held2012 Anoop Soni - Balika Vadhu  as BhairavJai Kalra - Bade Achhe Lagte Hain as Vikram Shergill 
Gaurav Chopra - Uttran as Raghuvendra Prathap Rathore
Vivek Mushran - Parvarrish – Kuchh Khattee Kuchh Meethi as  Lucky Singh Ahluwalia2013 Rithvik Dhanjani - Pavitra Rishta as Arjun Digvijay Kirloskar 
Jai Kalra - Bade Achhe Lagte Hain as Vikram Shergill 
Gaurav Chopra - Uttran as Raghuvendra Prathap Rathore 
Mukesh Khanna - Pyaar Ka Dard Hai Meetha Meetha Pyaara Pyaara as Purushottam Deewan
Chetan Pandit - Punar Vivaah as Suraj Pratap Sindhia2014 Aham Sharma - Mahabharat as KarnaSameer Dharmadhikari - Buddha as Sudhodhana
Gaurav Chopra - Uttran as Raghuvendra Prathap Rathore
Arav Chowdhary - Mahabharat as Bhishma
Rohit Bhardwaj - Mahabharat as Yudhishtra
 2016–2018 - No Event Held2019 Kunal Jaisingh as Omkara Singh Oberoi for Ishqbaaaz.
Shehzad Shaikh as Arjun Hooda for Bepannah
Manit Joura as Risabh Luthra for Kundali Bhagya
Vin Rana as Purab Khanna for Kumkum Bhagya
Bijay Anand as Vijaypath Noon for Dil Hi Toh Hai

Jury

 2010s2010 Sanjeev Seth - Yeh Rishta Kya Kehlata Hai as Vishambhar Nath2011 No Award2012 Nissar Khan - Na Aana Is Des Laado as Joginder Sangwan 
Darshan Jariwala - Saas Bina Sasural as Chedilal Chaturvedi
Anand Goradia - Na Aana Is Des Laado as Gajender Sangwan
Pawan Malhotra - Ek Nayi Chhoti Si Zindagi as Shyam
Jai Kalra - Bade Achhe Lagte Hain as Vikram Shergill
Anoop Soni - Balika Vadhu  as Bhairav2013 Aamir Dalvi - Hum Ne Li Hai- Shapath as Kavi 
Ayub Khan - Uttaran as Jogi Thakur
Vikrant Massey - Gumrah - Season 1 as Shobit 
Alok Nath - Kuch Toh Log Kahenge as Dr. Mathur
Late Dwaraka Prasad - Upanishad Ganga as Sevak2014 Shakti Anand - Bharat Ka Veer Putra – Maharana Pratap  as Maharana Udai SinghKapil Nirmal - Ek Veer Ki Ardaas...Veera as Nihal Singh
Alok Nath - Do Dil Bandhe Ek Dori Se as Balwant Rana
Neil Bhoopalam - 24 (Indian TV series) as Aditya Singhania
Sudhir Panday - Balika Vadhu as Premkishor Shekhar2019 Varun Badola - Internet Wala Love as Shubhankar VermaIndian Telly Award for Best Actor in a Supporting Role (Comedy)

Popular2014 Ali Asgar - Comedy Nights with Kapil as DadiSunil Grover - Comedy Nights with Kapil as Gutthi
Kiku Sharda - Comedy Nights with Kapil as Palak
Gautam Gulati - Diya Aur Baati Hum as Vikram Rathi	
Naveen Bawa - F.I.R. as Villain2015 Kiku Sharda - Akbar Birbal as AkbarSatish Kaushik - Sumit Sambhal Lega as Jasbir Walia
Paresh Ganatra - Chidiya Ghar as Ghotak
Sunil Grover - Comedy Nights with Kapil as Gutthi
Krushna Abhishek - Comedy Nights Bachao

Jury2014 Shridhar Watsar - Baal Veer as Dooba Dooba 1/Tauba Tauba' 
Gautam Gulati - Diya Aur Baati Hum as Vikram Rathi	
Saraansh Verma - Chidiya Ghar as Kapi Kesari Narayan
Sunil Kumar - Lapataganj - Ek Baar Phir as Suttilal Halwai
Naveen Bawa - F.I.R.'' as Villain

References

Indian Telly Awards